Delorge is a surname. Notable people with the surname include:

 Laurent Delorge (born 1979), Belgian footballer
 Kino Delorge (born 1998), Belgian footballer
 Peter Delorge (born 1980), Belgian footballer